Brian Ryan may refer to:

 Brian Ryan (Glee), a character on the TV series Glee
 Brian Ryan (hurler) (born 1998), Irish hurler for Limerick